The Bulgaria national badminton team represents Bulgaria in international badminton team competitions and is controlled by the Bulgarian Badminton Federation. The Bulgarian women's team achieved second place in the 2016 European Men's and Women's Team Badminton Championships, they were semifinalists two years prior.

The Bulgarian team have won a gold and a bronze medal at the European Games. National women's doubles specialists Gabriela Stoeva and Stefani Stoeva are the first Bulgarian players to enter the top 10 in the BWF World Ranking.

Participation in BWF competitions
Bulgaria have never competed in the Thomas Cup. The mixed team played in every Sudirman Cup tournament from 1991 to 2011. The women's team made its Uber Cup debut in 2016 but were halted in the group stage. 

Uber Cup

Sudirman Cup

Participation in European Team Badminton Championships

Men's Team

Women's Team

Mixed Team

Participation in Helvetia Cup

Participation in European Junior Team Badminton Championships
Mixed Team

Current squad 
The following players were selected to represent Bulgaria at the 2020 European Men's and Women's Team Badminton Championships.

Male players
Daniel Nikolov
Ivan Rusev
Peyo Boichinov
Stilian Makarski
Iliyan Stoynov
Alex Vlaar
Dimitar Yanakiev

Female players
Mariya Mitsova
Linda Zetchiri
Tanya Ivanova
Gergana Pavlova
Mihaela Zlatanova
Maria Delcheva
Hristomira Popovska
Kaloyana Nalbantova
Dimitria Popstoikova

References

Badminton
National badminton teams
Badminton in Bulgaria